In architecture, a parti is an organizing thought or decision behind an architect's design, presented in the form of a parti diagram, parti sketch, or a simple statement. The term comes from 15th century French, in which "parti pris" meant "decision taken."

The development of the parti frequently precedes the development of plan, section, and elevation diagrams.

History

Producing a quick sketch (esquisse) of the parti was a critical part of architectural training at the Beaux-Arts de Paris during the 19th and early part of the 20th Century.

In architecture school during the 1900s in the United States, one would have understood the term ‘parti’ as the "main idea" for the planimetric layout of a building. Its roots in the American architectural education system are derived from the Beaux-Arts de Paris. The word "parti" refers to the concept of ‘parti pris’, and refers to the main ‘idea’ of the organizing principle that is embodied in a design and often expressed by a simple geometric diagram. The "parti" often expresses the essence of an architectural design reduced to its essence.

Example

The parti  of the Lonja del Comercio building in Havana (in plan) is a perfect square and based on the classic 9 square problem that was used,   among others, by Peter Eisenman to design some of his houses  and Andrea Palladio in the design of many of his villas.

Gallery

Notes

References

Bibliography

 Colin Rowe, “Mathematics of the Ideal Villa,” Mathematics of the Ideal Villa and Other Essays (Cambridge, MA: MIT Press, 1976). First published in Architectural Review, 1947.
 Wittkower, Rudolf, "Architectural principles in the age of humanism," London, Warburg Institute, University of London, 1949.

External links
Parti Diagram with Kyle
How To Think Like An Architect: The Design Process
Architecture + Diagramming | Let’s Parti On | Vol. 01 | feat. Glenn Murcutt House and Casa da Musica
Architecture + Diagramming | Let’s Parti On | Vol. 02 | feat. Seattle Library and Chichu Art Museum

Architectural terminology